._. may refer to:

 An emoticon, used to express a neutral expression
 The letter R in Morse code

Articles with underscores in the title